Dedication is the second studio album by British electronic producer Zomby, released on 11 July 2011 through 4AD.

The album's first single "Natalia's Song" was embroiled in controversy in early 2012. Electronic producer Reark claims he wrote the loop that comprises the main portion of the song in 2007, and that he was not credited by Zomby for his contribution; in response, 4AD later amended the track credits to include Reark's name.

Critical reception

Dedication received positive reviews from music critics. At Metacritic, which assigns a normalized rating out of 100 to reviews from mainstream critics, the album received an average score of 79, based on 28 reviews, indicating "generally favorable reviews".

Dave Simpson of The Guardian gave note of the "pensive, thought-provoking sadness" throughout the record's production, highlighting the melodies as being reminiscent of the "dark, inverted negative[s]" synthpop of the Human League and the "minimal pianos and bare clonks" having a mixture of Keith Jarrett and Spooky that's "somewhere between dubstep and contemporary classical", concluding with, "But however you define it, its beautiful atmosphere of sadness and decay is hard to deny." The Independents Andy Gill praised Zomby for utilizing a minimalist approach to electronic music throughout the track listing, while also adding substance to them, concluding that "there's a pervasive haunted sense of loss and melancholy that links these 16 tracks together, giving Dedication a depth and elegance not often found in more dance-focused dubstep." Randall Roberts of the Los Angeles Times said that, "Each of the thousands of individual beats, bumps, dots and dashes on Dedication sound forged with a sculptor’s eye for form and shape, crafted and shined until they glisten."

Pitchfork contributor Jess Harvell said that despite lacking elements from previous works she commended Zomby for crafting "the most stylistically wide-ranging record he's released yet," giving praise to his evolution from "game cartridge kitsch" to rhythms that are reminiscent of Boards of Canada, saying that its "in many ways the work of a producer pushing himself to see how hard and how far he can push his music into new places." She added that listeners might be put off by the musically-varied tracks containing two- or three minute runtimes that hint at something more lengthy and fleshed out.

It ranked at number 8 on Spins "20 Best Dance Albums of 2011" list.

Track listing

Charts

References

External links
 

2011 albums
4AD albums
Zomby albums